The Guzmán Basin is an endorheic basin of northern Mexico and the southwestern United States. It occupies the northwestern portion of Chihuahua in Mexico, and extends into southwestern New Mexico in the United States.

Notable rivers of the Guzmán Basin are the Casas Grandes River, which empties into Lake Guzmán, the Santa Maria River, which empties into Lake Santa Maria, the Carmen River, and the Mimbres River of New Mexico.

The Guzmán Basin is home to several endemic and near-endemic fish species, including the Chihuahua chub (Gila nigrescens), Palomas pupfish (Cyprinodon pisteri), Whitefin pupfish (C. albivelis), Perrito de carbonera (C. fontinalis), and Guzmán trout (Oncorhynchus mykiss nelsoni).

References
 Ricketts, Taylor H; Eric Dinerstein; David M. Olson; Colby J. Loucks; et al. (1999). Terrestrial Ecoregions of North America: a Conservation Assessment. Island Press; Washington, DC.
 Echelle, Anthony A. (2004) "Death Valley Pupfishes, mtDNA Divergence Times and Drainage History" in Reheis, Marith C. (ed.) Geologic and Biotic Perspectives on Late Cenozoic Drainage History of the Southwestern Great Basin and Lower Colorado River Region: Conference Abstracts. Open-File Report 2005–1404, US Geologic Survey.
Minckley WL, Miller RR, Norris SM (2002). "Three New Pupfish Species, Cyprinodon (Teleostei, Cyprinodontidae), from Chihuahua, México, and Arizona, USA". Copeia: Vol. 2002, No. 3 pp. 687–7.
Propst, David L. and Jerome A. Stefferud (1994) "Distribution and Status of the Chihuahua Chub (Teleostei: Cyprinidae: Gila nigrescens), with Notes on Its Ecology and Associated Species". The Southwestern Naturalist, Vol. 39, No. 3 (Sep., 1994), pp. 224–234.
 Robert J. Behnke, Trout and Salmon of North America. publisher The Free Press, . Year 2002. pages=115–122, chapter Rainbow trout of Mexico.

Drainage basins of Mexico
Endorheic basins of North America
Endorheic basins of the United States
Landforms of Chihuahua (state)
Landforms of New Mexico
Freshwater ecoregions
Ecoregions of Mexico